George Monks is the name of:

George Monks (cricketer) (born 1929), English cricketer
George Howard Monks (1853–1933), American surgeon
George W. Monks, who served in the Indiana General Assembly in 1855

See also
George Monk (disambiguation)